Andreas Krause (born 30 June 1957) is a German former footballer.

Club career 
He played for Carl Zeiss Jena, the team of his hometown, for his entire youth and professional career.

International career 
Krause won four caps and scored two goals for East Germany.

References

External links
 
 
 

1957 births
Living people
German footballers
East German footballers
East Germany international footballers
FC Carl Zeiss Jena players
DDR-Oberliga players
Association football midfielders
Sportspeople from Jena
People from Bezirk Gera